State Road 125 (NM 125) is a state highway in the U.S. state of New Mexico maintained by the New Mexico Department of Transportation (NMDOT). The  road, located entirely within Lea County, begins at  US 380 near Tatum and ends at the Texas state line where the road meets the numerically continuous Texas State Highway 125 southwest of Bledsoe, TX. The road also has a major intersection with  NM 508.

Route description
The road proceeds to the north and then the northeast before NM 508 branches off to the west toward Crossroads. The road continues to the northeast to the state line and SH 125. NM 125 passes through mostly agricultural lands and oil and gas fields across the largely flat and featureless terrain of the Llano Estacado.

History
NM 125 was created sometime after 1941 probably in the early 1950s as Texas began the uncommon process of unofficially signing SH 125's predecessor route, Farm to Market Road 769, as a numerically continuous state highway in 1955.

Major intersections

See also

References

External links

125
Transportation in Lea County, New Mexico